Sasa Disic (born 	21 March 1986) is a German footballer.

Career
Born in Munich, Germany. In his youth he was playing for the local team TSV Moosach Hartmannshofen. From TSV 1865 Dachau he went to fifth level side Anker Wismar and played in 44 games for them, while scoring six goals. In 2007, he changed to 1. FC Union Solingen. In January 2009 he signed a two-year deal with the new founded Thailand Premier League club Pattaya United.

References

1986 births
Living people
German footballers
Expatriate footballers in Thailand
German expatriate sportspeople in Thailand
Association football midfielders
Footballers from Munich
1. FC Union Solingen players
Sasa Disic